La Salle College Preparatory is a private, Catholic college preparatory high school founded and run by the Institute of the Brothers of the Christian Schools in Pasadena, California and located in the Roman Catholic Archdiocese of Los Angeles. It was founded  in 1956 as La Salle High School. It was accredited in 1961 by the  University of California.

History
La Salle College Preparatory was founded in 1956 as La Salle High School. It was originally an all boys' school but became coeducational in 1993.

Notable alumni

 Phil Hendrie (1970) – radio personality, actor, and voiceover artist attended in the early 1970s.
 Gerry Janeski (1964) - former MLB player
 Bill Quirk (1963) – politician representing California's 20th State Assembly district
 Chase Rettig – starting American football quarterback for Boston College and NFL quarterback (2010–2013)
 James Roosevelt, Jr. (1963) – lawyer and grandson of President Franklin D. Roosevelt.

References

External links
 
  Blakeslee Library - La Salle High School
 High School Placement Test Information

Lasallian schools in the United States
Roman Catholic secondary schools in Los Angeles County, California
Educational institutions established in 1956
Boys' schools in California
Catholic secondary schools in California
1956 establishments in California